Bruklinas is a privately owned commercial zone in Šiauliai, Lithuania. It consists of shopping, entertainment, car service, office and hotel facilities, its total floor area is 50,000 m2 and land area is 9 ha.

Bruklinas was developed by Ogmios group. Previously a location for "Šiaulių Oda" factory, it was initially redeveloped as a smaller Ogmios Šiauliai shopping mall, and rebranded Bruklinas after a major expansion was completed in 2006-2007.

Bruklinas means Brooklyn in Lithuanian and the mall is designed after this borough and New York City in general, including motifs of the Brooklyn Bridge in its exterior.

28,000 m² of the total floor area is outlet shopping mall (anchor tenant "Norfa" supermarket, 5000 m² ), 8,000 m² is a future hotel/office building, 15,000 m² is an interior and home decoration store, with a lot for another 10,000 m² building available.

External links
 Official website

References

Companies based in Šiauliai
Shopping malls in Lithuania
Lithuanian companies established in 2007
2007 establishments in Lithuania